Field dressing (or gralloching)
is the process of removing the internal organs of  hunted game, and is a necessary step in obtaining and preserving meat from wild animals such as deer.  Field dressing must be done as soon possible after the animal is killed in order to ensure rapid body-heat loss and to prevent bacteria from growing on the surface of the carcass.  Field dressing helps maintain the overall quality of the meat. It also makes it considerably easier for a hunter to carry larger game from the hunt area.

Tools 
 
Most hunters use a sharp knife for field dressing.  Other tools can be used such as axes or saws. However, the fact that harvesting locations are generally in remote areas makes the transporting and use of larger tools impractical.

Using a knife specifically designed for field dressing and the use of surgical gloves can greatly aid in sanitation.

Risk of disease 
Chronic wasting disease (CWD) is a neurological disease and has been found in a growing percentage of deer and elk in certain geographical areas in Canada and the United States. Although there have been reports in the popular press of humans being affected by CWD, a study by the Centers for Disease Control and Prevention (CDC) suggests that "[m]ore epidemiologic and laboratory studies are needed to monitor the possibility of such transmissions."
The epidemiological study further concludes that, "[a]s a precaution, hunters should avoid eating deer and elk tissues known to harbor the CWD agent (e.g., brain, spinal cord, eyes, spleen, tonsils, lymph nodes) from areas where CWD has been identified." Tests have also been developed to check for the presence of CWD.

See also
Dressed weight

References
https://ohiodnr.gov/static/documents/wildlife/hunting-trapping/field%20dressing%20deer%20pub111.pdf

External links

Field Dressing Guide
What does field dressing harvest mean?

Hunting
Meat industry